John Rich (born January 7, 1974) is an American country music singer-songwriter. From 1992 to 1998, he was a member of the country music band Lonestar, in which he played bass guitar and alternated with Richie McDonald as lead vocalist like Brooks & Dunn.  After departing from the band in 1998, he embarked on a solo career on BNA Records in the late 1990s, releasing two singles for the label and recording Underneath the Same Moon, which was not released until 2006. In 2001, he self-released Rescue Me, an album he was inspired to record by a cancer patient named Katie Darnell.  By 2003, he joined Big Kenny to form the duo Big & Rich, who released three albums on Warner Bros. Records as well as ten singles, including the Number One "Lost in This Moment". After Big & Rich went on hiatus in 2007, Rich began work on a third solo album, Son of a Preacher Man, which has produced two more chart singles. In 2011, Rich released two extended plays, Rich Rocks and For the Kids, before re-establishing Big & Rich in 2012.

Music career

Lonestar

John Rich was born in Amarillo, Texas; the son of Jim, a Baptist preacher, and Judy Overton Rich.  John graduated from Dickson County Senior High in Dickson, Tennessee and after graduation moved to Nashville where he worked as a singer at Opryland USA. He wanted to be a professional team roper. Not long after, he met up with the group Texasee, which eventually changed its name to Lonestar. While in Lonestar, Rich was the bass guitarist and, on some occasions, the lead singer like Brooks & Dunn (one of the band's singles, "Heartbroke Every Day," featured his lead vocals). Rich also co-wrote two of the band's singles: "Come Cryin' to Me" and "Say When", the former being a number-one single for the group. In January 1998, Rich departed from Lonestar. Afterward, Rich became a solo artist with BNA Records, the same label to which Lonestar was signed. He charted two singles for the label and recorded an album which did not see release until 2006. In 2001, he recorded and self-released Rescue Me, an album he was inspired to record after meeting cancer patient Katie Darnell.

Big & Rich

Rich joined Big Kenny in 2002 to form the duo Big & Rich. The duo recorded three studio albums for Warner Bros. Records: Horse of a Different Color, Comin' to Your City and Between Raising Hell and Amazing Grace, in 2004, 2005 and 2007 respectively. These albums accounted for ten singles on the country charts, including the Number One "Lost in This Moment". Rich also co-wrote all of the duo's singles, primarily with Big Kenny. In the wake of Big & Rich's success, his 1999 solo album Underneath the Same Moon was issued via BNA, coinciding with the release of Big Kenny's previously-unreleased solo album Live a Little.  A fourth Big & Rich studio album was released in the summer of 2012, with the inspiring "That's Why I Pray" reaching No. 15 on the country charts.

Work for other artists

During Big & Rich's success, Rich also worked as a songwriter and producer for other artists. His work included production for Gretchen Wilson, Keith Anderson, Jewel and John Anderson. In the same time span, he co-wrote multiple singles for other artists, including the Number One hits "Redneck Woman" for Wilson, "Mississippi Girl" for Faith Hill and "Why" for Jason Aldean.

He also has a co-write on Taylor Swift's 2008 album, Fearless, titled "The Way I Loved You".

In 2011, Rich recorded a song with heavy metal band Black Label Society, entitled "Darkest Days", featured on their compilation album, The Song Remains Not the Same.

In 2016, Rich added his voice to a duet with Marie Osmond on her album Music Is Medicine with the song titled "Love This Tough".

Son of a Preacher Man
In January 2009, Rich released his third solo single on Warner Bros. Records. The song, "Another You", is the lead-off single to Rich's second studio album, Son of a Preacher Man, which was released on March 24, 2009. He followed this song up with another single, "Shuttin' Detroit Down", recorded only one week before its release in January 2009. Rich promoted the song, which addresses the Chrysler and General Motors bailouts, at Michigan radio stations. The song debuted at No. 34 on the Billboard Hot Country Songs chart for the chart week of February 14, 2009, becoming his first solo Top 40 hit and peaking at No. 12 in April. A third single, "The Good Lord and the Man", debuted at No. 59 on the country chart and peaked at No. 56 in July 2009.

Rich Rocks and For the Kids
Both Rich Rocks and For the Kids have only produced one single between them. Country Done Come to Town was released as a single from Rich Rocks in mid-2010 and was a minor chart success.

Television work

In 2007, Rich hosted the first season of a reality show on Country Music Television called Gone Country, which featured celebrities such as Brady Bunch actress Maureen McCormick, singers Bobby Brown, Sisqo, Julio Iglesias Jr., Dee Snider, Carnie Wilson and American Idol runner-up Diana DeGarmo as they try to become songwriters with the help of Nashville songwriters as the celebrities are paired together with the songwriters. The show was filmed at the former home of Barbara Mandrell. He has hosted two more seasons since then.

Rich also served as a judge on the 2008 version of Nashville Star on NBC along with Jewel, singer-songwriter Jeffrey Steele, and host Billy Ray Cyrus.

Rich was a candidate in the 2011 season of The Celebrity Apprentice, which premiered on March 6. In episode 5, he lost as Project Manager for the men's team, Backbone. Despite the first loss, he later won 2 more tasks as Project Manager, raising $1,266,908 for St. Jude Children's Research Hospital. Rich competed with Marlee Matlin in the live season finale, where he was declared the season winner, and received an additional $250,000 for his charity.

Rich served as a mentor in the 2012 reality/competition series The Next: Fame Is at Your Doorstep.

Personal life
John Rich and his wife, Joan, married on December 6, 2008.

Political activism
In the 2008 U.S. presidential race, Rich originally supported Fred Thompson. He later released a campaign song on his website in support of presidential candidate John McCain in August 2008 called "Raisin' McCain". He performed in the closing ceremony of the Republican National Convention on September 3, 2008. He endorsed the Conservative Party candidate Doug Hoffman in the special congressional election in Northern New York in 2009. In 2010 he endorsed Zach Wamp for Governor of Tennessee and hosted parties at his Nashville home in support of Wamp's campaign.

On April 7, 2015, Rich's song "Shuttin' Detroit Down" was featured in Senator Rand Paul's 2016 presidential campaign announcement. He later declared his support for presumptive nominee Donald Trump following Paul's exit from the race. Big & Rich would later perform at a pre-inaugural ceremony on January 19, 2017, after Trump's victory in the general election. On May 30, 2019, he released "Shut Up About Politics" featuring presenters of the Fox News Channel programme The Five.

In 2020, Rich made headlines when he accused the Lipscomb Academy Dean of Intercultural Development Brittany Paschall of racist "indoctrination". Students at the school were assigned to read the essay "Whose Story Is It?" which mentions white privilege. This essay was written by Laurie Halse Anderson, a white woman. Rich claimed the essay could harm white children and claimed "racism does not exist at this school based on my experience there". Lipscomb Academy's adjacent university had previously faced allegations of racist events happening on campus. Although she did not distribute the essay to the children, Brittany Paschall, the school's dean of intercultural development, was dismissed from her position in 2020 following this incident.

In 2021, Rich spoke at the Tennessee State Capitol in favor of the "book-banning/burning bill." He accused teachers and librarians of grooming children and likened them to pedophiles. The books up on the chopping block with the passage of this bill included Ruby Bridges Goes to School, an illustrated version of Martin Luther King Jr.'s I Have a Dream speech, and Maus.

Discography

Studio albums

Extended plays

Singles

A "I Pray for You" also peaked at number 63 on the Canadian RPM Country Tracks chart.

Featured singles

Videography

Music videos

Guest appearances

References

1974 births
American country bass guitarists
American country singer-songwriters
Big & Rich members
Living people
Musicians from Amarillo, Texas
Singer-songwriters from Texas
Warner Records artists
Lonestar members
BNA Records artists
Texas Republicans
Reprise Records artists
American country record producers
Guitarists from Texas
American male bass guitarists
People from Dickson, Tennessee
21st-century American male singers
21st-century American singers
Country musicians from Texas
Country musicians from Tennessee
Record producers from Texas
21st-century American bass guitarists
Participants in American reality television series
The Apprentice (franchise) winners
American male singer-songwriters
Singer-songwriters from Tennessee
Judges in American reality television series